Hairy palms and soles are both a type of cutaneous condition characterized by a hereditary hypertrichosis affecting the palms and soles.  This condition is inherited in an autosomal dominant fashion.

See also 
 List of cutaneous conditions
 DKK2
 Masturbation, which an old wives' tale claims causes hairy palms

References 

Conditions of the skin appendages